is a group of relief sculptures of the late Heian or early Kamakura period in Bungotakada, Ōita Prefecture, Japan. The image of Fudō Myōō measures 8.07 m and that of Dainichi Nyorai 6.82 m. The carvings are an Important Cultural Property and the area has been designated an Historic Site.

See also
 Japanese sculpture
 Daibutsu
 Usuki Stone Buddhas

References

Japanese sculpture
Tourist attractions in Ōita Prefecture
Important Cultural Properties of Japan
Buildings and structures in Ōita Prefecture
Outdoor sculptures in Japan